Cookia sulcata, or Cook's turban, is a species of large sea snail, a marine gastropod mollusc in the family Turbinidae, the turban snails.

Description
The length of the shell varies between 50 mm and 90 mm. The large, imperforate, rather thin shell is conic. The periphery is rounded. The spire is more or less elevated. The sutures are deeply impressed. The seven whorls are well rounded, with close lamellose incremental striae, and corrugated by obliquely descending subtuberculose folds. The  base is flattened bearing concentric densely squamose lirae, deeply concave in the center, and indented in the place of the umbilicus. The aperture is transversely oval, very oblique, pearly and somewhat corrugated within. The thin columella is arcuate. The umbilical region and part of base is covered with a thin callus. The operculum is brownish or white inside.

The median tooth of the radula has a long basal plate and a short body. It bears no cusp, and has small supporting wings. The first lateral also is much like that in Pomaulax. The others bear cusps. The inner marginal is very broad, with wide cusp. The cusps of outer marginals are simple.

Distribution
This marine species occurs off New Zealand.

References

Further reading 
 Powell A W B, New Zealand Mollusca, William Collins Publishers Ltd, Auckland, New Zealand 1979 
 Glen Pownall, New Zealand Shells and Shellfish, Seven Seas Publishing Pty Ltd, Wellington, New Zealand 1979 
 Spencer, H.; Marshall. B. (2009). All Mollusca except Opisthobranchia. In: Gordon, D. (Ed.) (2009). New Zealand Inventory of Biodiversity. Volume One: Kingdom Animalia. 584 pp
 Alf A. & Kreipl K. (2011) The family Turbinidae. Subfamilies Turbininae Rafinesque, 1815 and Prisogasterinae Hickman & McLean, 1990. In: G.T. Poppe & K. Groh (eds), A Conchological Iconography. Hackenheim: Conchbooks. pp. 1–82, pls 104-245.

External links 
 

sulcata
Gastropods of New Zealand
Gastropods described in 1791
Taxa named by Johann Friedrich Gmelin